Pestalosphaeria concentrica is a plant pathogen infecting rhododendrons.

References

External links 
 Index Fungorum
 USDA ARS Fungal Database

Fungal plant pathogens and diseases
Ornamental plant pathogens and diseases
Xylariales
Fungi described in 1975